Ningaluk River (also Ninglick River) (Ningliq in Yup'ik) is a channel,  long, between Baird Inlet and Hazen Bay on the west coast of the U.S. state of Alaska. Flowing generally west, it enters the bay north of Kigigak Island.

The U.S. Marine Corps has been working to create emergency shelter, roads, homes, and an airfield in nearby Mertarvik for 400 Yupik Eskimo displaced from Newtok along the Ninglick River. The federal government is supporting the  move, which is necessitated by erosion, melting, and the sinking of permafrost at Newtok.

See also
List of rivers of Alaska

References

External links
Fishing in the Ninglick

Rivers of Bethel Census Area, Alaska
Rivers of Alaska
Rivers of Unorganized Borough, Alaska